David Kemp (born 10 April 1984) is an Australian former professional road bicycle racer who competed with the Belgian Veranda's Willems-Accent professional team in 2011, his final season. Kemp secured the contract at the last-minute, after the collapse of Chris White's ill-fated Pegasus Racing/Fly V project.

During his multi-year tenure with the Fly V Australia team, Kemp worked primarily as a domestique, though he won silver at the Australian road championships in January 2010 and finished third overall in the King of the Mountain classification at the Tour Down Under that same year.

Major results

2006
1st Australian Cycling Grand Prix
2008
1st Stage 1 – Tour of the Murray River
1st Stage 2 – Tour of the Murray River
1st Stage 3 – Tour of Gippsland
1st Victorian Criterium Championships
2nd Overall Tour of the Murray River
2nd Metropolitan Championships Victoria
2nd stage 1 – Tour of Perth (National Road Series Australia)
2nd Stage 2 – Tour of Mersey Valley (National Road Series Australia)
3rd Overall – Tour of Perth (National Road Series Australia)
3rd Overall – Tour of Mersey Valley (National Road Series Australia)
3rd ITT – Tour of Mersey Valley (National Road Series Australia)
4th ITT – Tour of Perth (National Road Series Australia)
4th stage 3 – Tour of Mersey Valley (National Road Series Australia)
2009
1st Stage 2 – Tour of the Murray River
2nd Stage 2 – Tour of Gippsland
2nd Stage 6 – Tour of Gippsland
2nd overall – Tour of Gippsland
2nd overall Tour of Geelong
2nd Stage 1 Tour de Murrieta USA
3rd Boulevard Road Race USA
3rd Stage 2 Tour of Geelong
3rd Stage 4 Tour of Geelong (VIC ITT Champs)
3rd Stage 5 Tour of Atlanta USA
7th overall Tour de Murrieta USA
2010
1st Tour of Taihu Lake China, UCI 1.2
2nd Australian National Road Race Championships
Member of the UniSA Aus National Team at the Tour Down Under
Most aggressive rider stage 2 Tour Down Under
3rd overall King of the Mountain Classification – Tour Down Under
2nd Redlands Classic, USA
3rd Lake Front Classic, USA

References

External links
 
 Team UniSA Supporters' Club
 Eurosport Profile

1984 births
Living people
Australian male cyclists
Doping cases in cycling
Doping cases in Australian cycling